Banstead railway station serves the village of Banstead in the borough of Reigate and Banstead in Surrey. Its wider definition of Banstead Village and Nork wards is relevant here as both are equally well served by it as it lies narrowly in the latter. The station and all trains are operated by Southern and it is on the Epsom Downs line, part of the Sutton & Mole Valley Line services.

Housing and gardens in Banstead in this area border Greater London 500m away to the north. Accordingly, since January 2006, the station has been included in Travelcard Zone 6. The station lies some distance to the north-west of the High Street on the edge of Banstead Downs.

Station buildings

The station was opened by the London, Brighton and South Coast Railway on 22 May 1865 as part of the Epsom Downs branch line. The branch was originally laid as double track to accommodate Epsom Downs horse race traffic and was electrified on 17 June 1928. In the 1940s, the station's name was painted in large letters on the roof as a navigation tool for pilots coming into Croydon Airport. Due to the destruction by fire of the Epsom Downs signal box in November 1981, the branch was singled for most of its length in October 1982 and trains stopping at Banstead now use only the Down platform where there is a shelter. The Up track and platform have been removed.

Services
All services at Banstead are operated by Southern using  EMUs.

The typical off-peak service in trains per hour is:
 2 tph to  via 
 2 tph to 

Prior to May 2018, the station was served by an hourly service on weekdays and Saturdays only, with no Sunday service. In May 2018, a half-hourly service was introduced on all days of the week.

There is an electronic display showing arrivals and departures.  A ticket machine was installed in October 2011 replacing a Permit to Travel machine and there are also 2 Oystercard readers.

References

External links 

Map includes Epsom Down Line
The Epsom Downs branch website
Station name on the roof

Railway stations in Surrey
Former London, Brighton and South Coast Railway stations
Railway stations in Great Britain opened in 1865
Railway stations served by Govia Thameslink Railway